Paranan, also called Palanan, is a Philippine language belonging to the Northern Luzon languages. It is spoken in the northeastern coastal areas of Isabela, Philippines. Lexically but not grammatically it is extremely close to Pahanan Agta as groups of both languages were together isolated from other communities and remained in constant interaction.

References

Northeastern Luzon languages
Languages of Isabela (province)